Ossinissa is a monotypic genus of  cellar spiders containing the single species, Ossinissa justoi. It was first described by D. Dimitrov & C. Ribera in 2005, and is only found on the Canary Islands.

See also
 List of Pholcidae species

References

Monotypic Araneomorphae genera
Pholcidae